In Islam, wasat (moderation) is one of the most basic terms and deliberately used topics. In the sense of shariah, it is a central characteristic of Islamic creed and has been used from the very beginning of Islam. It refers to a justly balanced way of life, avoiding extremes and experiencing things in moderation.

Etymology
Wasat, also called wasatiyyah is the Arabic word for best, middle, centered, balanced, middle way or moderation in the Islamic context, meanwhile Qasd (قصد) and Iqtisad (اقتصاد) are other terms for moderation in Islam, which mean "right way," "middle way," and "honest, truthful way." The term is also used in the Qur'an and Hadith to mean moderation. For example: Surah Nahl (16) in verse 9, Surah Ma'idah (5) in verse 66, Surah Tawba (9) in verse 42, Surah Luqman (31) in verse 19 and 32, and Surah Fatir (35) in verse 32. The person who follows wasat/qasd is called wasati/wasiti'/Muqsidin'. In addition, the words Ittidal and Saddad also appear in the Hadith in the sense of moderation, the word Saddad (السداد) is used more often, and it has multiple meanings, namely, to correct, to straighten, to pay a debt, to close a hole, to perform an action, etc.  Its noun form Tasdeed (التسديد) literally means refinement, directing the sight (or binoculars) in a certain direction.  In many places in the hadith, the word "Saddidu wa Qaribu" (سَدِّدُوا وَقَارِبُوا) is found which translates as "straightening the right path or adopting the middle path and approaching", and also as an instruction to the imam and khatib to straighten the queue of congregational prayers or prayers. The word is used, and when straightening a prayer queue in Non-Arab countries, it is used as a translation of the original Arabic word to straighten the queue, fill in the blanks, and come closer.

In scripture
In Quran
As Wasat

As Qasd

In hadiths

As wasat
In a hadith, Islamic prophet Muhammad is purported as saying that, the meaning of wasat (moderation) in verse 2:143 of Quran is adl (justice).

As sadad, qasd or iqtisad, and ittidal

In popular culture
A newspaper in Bahrain is named Al-Wasat ('the middle') for its editorial viewpoint of "Promoting the rational middle-ground in debate and tendencies."

See also
 Wasatiyyah Institute Malaysia, a Malaysian NGO preaching moderate Islam.
 Al-Wasat Party, a moderate ('middle') political party in Egypt
 Al-Wasat (Bahraini newspaper)
 Delta Geminorum, a star also known by its Arabic name, Wasat, for middle (star)
 Islam Nusantara, an Indonesian distinct Islamic philosophy that promotes the idea of theological moderation called tawasut'' within its ideology.
 Centrism, a political ideology
 Lagom, a Swedish concept with similar meaning
 Liberalism and progressivism within Islam
 Moderate Islam, a modern moderate denomination of  Islam
 Moderation, the process of eliminating or lessening extremes.
 The Moderation in Belief, book by Al-Ghazali
 Moderate, a middle position in a left/right political scale
 Via media, the philosophy of the 'middle way'

References

Islamic terminology
Liberal and progressive movements within Islam